Ellen Lewis is an American casting director.  Her credits include The Queen's Gambit, The Devil Wears Prada,  A League of Their Own, Forrest Gump  and Martin Scorsese's New York Stories, Goodfellas, Casino, The Departed, The Wolf of Wall Street and The Irishman.

Lewis began her casting career working as an assistant for Juliet Taylor. She helped to cast films including Hannah and Her Sisters and Working Girl before she began working independently in 1989.  She has worked extensively with Scorsese since then; her second  solo casting credit was for Goodfellas.  A three-time Emmy Award winner  (for her work on Boardwalk Empire: Season 1, Angels in America and The Queen's Gambit) and seven-time nominee, she has won three Casting Society of America Artios Awards.  She received its Hoyt Bowers Award in 2015, which honors a casting professional who has elevated the profession.

References

American casting directors
Women casting directors
Emmy Award winners
Living people
Year of birth missing (living people)

External links